There were four special elections to the United States House of Representatives in 1919, during the 65th United States Congress and 66th United States Congress.

65th United States Congress  

|-
| 
| Carter Glass
|  | Democratic
| 1902 
|  | Incumbent resigned December 6, 1918, to become U.S. Secretary of the Treasury.New member  elected February 25, 1919.Democratic hold.Winner also elected the same day to the next term, see below.
| nowrap | 

|-
| 
| Edward E. Robbins
|  | Republican
| 1916
|  | Incumbent member-elect died January 25, 1919.New member elected March 4, 1919.Democratic gain.
| nowrap | 

|}

66th United States Congress  

|-
! 
| Carter Glass
|  | Democratic
| 1902 
|  | Incumbent resigned December 6, 1918, to become U.S. Secretary of the Treasury.New member  elected February 25, 1919.Democratic hold.Winner also elected the same day to finish the current term, see above.
| nowrap | 

|-
! 
| Charles C. Carlin
|  | Democratic
| 1907 
|  | Incumbent resigned to manage the presidential campaign of A. Mitchell Palmer.New member elected April 27, 1919.Democratic hold.
| nowrap | 

|-
! 
| Charles August Sulzer
|  | Democratic
| 1916
|  | Incumbent died April 28, 1919 during an election recount.New member elected June 5, 1919.Democratic hold.Winner would later be unseated by the contested election.
| nowrap | 

|-
! 
| John L. Burnett
|  | Democratic
| 1898
|  | Incumbent died May 13, 1919.New member elected September 30, 1919.Democratic hold.
| nowrap | 

|-
! 
| Joseph Bryan Thompson
|  | Democratic
| 1912
|  | Incumbent died September 18, 1919.New member elected November 8, 1919.Republican gain.
| nowrap | 

|-
! 

|-
! 

|}

References 

 
1919